The European Figure Skating Championships were held on January 16 and 17 in Davos, Switzerland. Elite figure skaters competed for the title of European Champion in the category of men's singles. The competitors performed only compulsory figures.

These were the first European Figure Skating Championships after two years. In 1902 and 1903, the Europeans were scheduled to be held in Amsterdam. In 1902, the championships were cancelled due to no ice. In 1903, the championships were cancelled in Amsterdam also due to no ice but were transferred to Stockholm. There the Europeans were cancelled because there was only one contestant.

Results

Men

Judges:
 Tibor von Földváry 
 Gustav Hügel 
 Dr. Kurt Dannenberg 
 P. Birum 
 C. Hopkins 
 R. Büchtger 
 G. R. Wood

References

Sources
 Result List provided by the ISU

European Figure Skating Championships, 1904
European Figure Skating Championships
1904 in Swiss sport
Sport in Davos
International figure skating competitions hosted by Switzerland
January 1904 sports events